Anna Salmberg, née Brinck (1788, Copenhagen – 1868, Åbo), was a Finnish educator. She was the founder and manager of Salmbergska flickpensionen ('Salmberg Pension for Girls'), one of the most famed and fashionable educational institutions for females in Finland in her time.

Life
Anna Salmberg was born in Denmark but was raised in Danish Caribbean, where English became her first language.  She married the Finnish sea captain Arvid Abraham Salmberg (d. 1809), and moved with him to Finland.  She had no children.  When she was widowed, she supported herself as a teacher. 

In 1823, she founded and managed the Salmberg Pension for Girls in Åbo.  Since the foundation of the Christina Krook school in the 1780s, there had been a few private girls' schools in Finland, which remained the only secondary education available for females in Finland until the foundation of the Svenska fruntimmersskolan i Åbo and Svenska fruntimmersskolan i Helsingfors (1844).  Of these schools, the Salmberg school in Åbo, and the school of Baroness von Rosen in Helsinki, were described as the most notable. 

Anna Salmberg defended women's right to education.  In her correspondence, she expressed the view, that although the women of Finland may be ignorant, it was the fault of their families, and particularly their fathers, for keeping them that way by not providing them with education and then calling them ignorant.  As was customary for schools of her kind, most of the education focused on accomplishments, such as drawing, embroidery and etiquette, but her school was recommended for a high level in the subjects, and her school offered more languages than were usual for a girls' school. In addition to French, she also tutored in the English language, at a time when that language was considered more important to learn for men and it was still otherwise unknown in girls' schools in Finland. Her most known students were the writer Fredrika Runeberg and the poet Augusta Lundahl, both of whom studied at her school in 1824–1825.

References

1788 births
1868 deaths
19th-century Finnish educators
Finnish educators
Finnish schoolteachers
Finnish people of Danish descent